Gorodishche is an urban locality (a work settlement) and the administrative center of Gorodishchensky District of Volgograd Oblast, Russia, located  northwest of Volgograd. Population:

References

Urban-type settlements in Volgograd Oblast
Tsaritsynsky Uyezd